Jaroenchai Kesagym (เจริญชัย เคซ่ายิม) is a Thai Muay Thai kickboxer.

Biography and career

On August 22, 2005 Jaroenchai traveled to Japan to defend his Rajadamnern Stadium title at SNKA Titans 2nd. He defeated Hiroki Ishii by unanimous decision.

On August 21, 2010 Jaroenchai traveled to China to face Hiromasa Masuda for the interim WBC Muay Thai World Lightweight title. He won the fight by split decision.

In 2017 Jaroenchai came out of retirement to take a kickboxing fight on the DEEP Hachioji Chojin Matsuri card in Japan where he had been working as a trainer for multiple years. He beat Kohei Nishikawa by second round TKO. This win granted him the #9 spot on the Liverkick Featherweight world rankings.

Titles and accomplishments
World Muaythai Council 
 2x WMC World Lightweight Champion (2006, 2008)
World Boxing Council Muay Thai
 2010 WBC Muay Thai World Lightweight Champion
Professional Boxing Association of Thailand (PAT) 
 2005 Thailand Lightweight Champion (defended once)
Rajadamnern Stadium 
 2005 Rajadamnern Stadium Lightweight Champion (defended once)
 2009 Rajadamnern Stadium Lightweight Champion
Omnoi Stadium
 2006 Omnoi Stadium Lightweight Champion

Fight record

|-  style="text-align:center; background:#fbb"
| 2021-12-12|| Loss ||align=left| Naoki Tanaka || RISE 153 || Tokyo, Japan || TKO (Punches)|| 3 ||0:46

|-  style="background:#cfc;"
| 2017-04-02 || Win ||align=left| Kohei Nishikawa || DEEP Hachioji Chojin Matsuri|| Hachiōji, Japan || TKO (Punches) || 2 || 2:28

|-  style="background:#cfc;"
| 2011-02-28 || Win ||align=left| Saenchainoi Phumphanmuang || Rajadamnern Stadium || Bangkok, Thailand || Decision || 5 || 3:00

|-  style="background:#fbb;"
| 2011-01-06 || Loss ||align=left| Jomthong Chuwattana || Daorungchujaroen, Rajadamnern Stadium || Bangkok, Thailand || Decision || 5 || 3:00

|-  style="background:#cfc;"
| 2010-11-01 || Win ||align=left| Saksurin Kiatyongyut || Daorungchujaroen, Rajadamnern Stadium || Bangkok, Thailand || Decision || 5 || 3:00

|-  style="background:#cfc;"
| 2010-08-21 || Win ||align=left| Hiromasa Masuda || || Haikou, China || Decision (Split) || 5 || 3:00
|-
! style="background:white" colspan=9 |

|-  style="background:#cfc;"
| 2010-05-26 || Win ||align=left| Extra Sor.Rerkchai || Daorungchujaroen, Rajadamnern Stadium || Bangkok, Thailand || Decision || 5 || 3:00

|-  style="background:#fbb;"
| 2010-03-22 || Loss ||align=left| Extra Sor.Rerkchai || Daorungchujaroen, Rajadamnern Stadium || Bangkok, Thailand || Decision || 5 || 3:00
|-
! style="background:white" colspan=9 |

|-  style="background:#cfc;"
| 2010-02-18 || Win ||align=left| Sagatpetch IngramGym || Daorungchujaroen, Rajadamnern Stadium || Bangkok, Thailand || Decision || 5 || 3:00

|-  style="background:#fbb;"
| 2009-07-02 || Loss||align=left| Samsamut Kaitchongkhao || Daorungchujaroen, Rajadamnern Stadium || Bangkok, Thailand || Decision || 5 || 3:00

|-  style="background:#fbb;"
| 2009-01-19 || Loss||align=left| Nuathoranee Sitniwat || Daorungchujaroen, Rajadamnern Stadium || Bangkok, Thailand || Decision || 5 || 3:00

|-  style="background:#cfc;"
| 2008-11-26 || Win||align=left| Vinailek Por.Rangsan || Daorungchujaroen, Rajadamnern Stadium || Bangkok, Thailand || Decision || 5 || 3:00
|-
! style="background:white" colspan=9 |

|-  style="background:#fbb;"
| 2008-10-30 || Loss||align=left| Vinailek Por.Rangsan || Daorungchujaroen, Rajadamnern Stadium || Bangkok, Thailand || Decision || 5 || 3:00

|-  style="background:#fbb;"
| 2008-09-01 || Loss ||align=left| Petchasawin Seantransferry || Rajadamnern Stadium || Bangkok, Thailand || KO || 4 || 
|-
! style="background:white" colspan=9 |

|-  bgcolor="#fbb"
| 2008-07-03 || Loss ||align=left| Singmanee Kaewsamrit || Daorungchujarern, Rajadamnern Stadium || Bangkok, Thailand || Decision || 5 || 3:00

|-  style="background:#cfc;"
| 2008-05-22 || Win ||align=left| Nongbee Kiatyongyut|| Kiatyongyut, Rajadamnern Stadium || Bangkok, Thailand || Decision || 5 || 3:00

|-  style="background:#cfc;"
| 2008-04-24 || Win ||align=left| Ikkyusang Kor.Rungthanakiat || Jarumueang, Rajadamnern Stadium || Bangkok, Thailand || KO || 3 ||

|-  style="background:#cfc;"
| 2008-04-03 || Win ||align=left| Chalermkiat Sor Chokkitchai || Daorungchujaroen, Rajadamnern Stadium || Bangkok, Thailand || Decision || 5 || 3:00
|-
! style=background:white colspan=9 |

|-  style="background:#cfc;"
| ? || Win ||align=left| Fasura Wor Petchpun || Rajadamnern Stadium || Bangkok, Thailand || KO (Left Hook)||3  ||

|-  style="background:#cfc;"
| 2007- || Win ||align=left| Iquezang Kor.Rungthanakeat ||  || Bangkok, Thailand || Decision || 5|| 33:00  
|-
! style=background:white colspan=9 |

|-  style="background:#fbb;"
| 2007-08-02 || Loss ||align=left| Jomthong Chuwattana || Rajadamnern Stadium || Bangkok, Thailand || Decision || 5 || 3:00

|-  style="background:#fbb;"
| 2007-05-03 || Loss ||align=left| Lerdsila Chumpairtour || Daorungchujaroen, Rajadamnern Stadium || Bangkok, Thailand || Decision || 5 || 3:00

|- style="background:#fbb;"
| 2007-03-15 || Loss ||align=left| Saenchai Sor.Kingstar || Chujaroen, Rajadamnern Stadium || Bangkok, Thailand || KO (body kick) || 3 ||

|-  style="background:#cfc;"
| 2007-01-25 || Win||align=left| Wuttichai Sor.Yupinda || Rajadamnern Stadium || Bangkok, Thailand || KO || 2 ||

|-  style="background:#cfc;"
| 2006-12-21 || Win||align=left| Saiyoknoi Sakchainarong || Chujaroen + Jarumueang, Rajadamnern Stadium || Bangkok, Thailand || Decision || 5 || 3:00

|-  bgcolor="#cfc"
| 2006-11-12|| Win ||align=left| Satoshi Kobayashi || AJKF Solid Fist || Tokyo, Japan || Decision (Unanimous) || 5 ||3:00

|-  style="background:#cfc;"
| 2006-09-28 || Win||align=left| Numphon P.K.Stereo || Jarumueang, Rajadamnern Stadium || Bangkok, Thailand || KO || 4 ||  
|-
! style=background:white colspan=9 |

|-  style="background:#fbb;"
| 2006-08-23 || Loss||align=left| Lerdsila Chumpairtour || Jarumueang, Rajadamnern Stadium || Bangkok, Thailand || Decision || 5 || 3:00

|-  bgcolor="#cfc"
| 2006-07-24 || Win ||align=left| Nuaphet Sakhomsil || Daorungchujarean, Rajadamnern Stadium || Bangkok, Thailand || Decision || 5 || 3:00

|-  bgcolor="#fbb"
| 2006-06-29 || Loss ||align=left| Samranchai 96Peenang || Jarumueang, Rajadamnern Stadium || Bangkok, Thailand || Decision || 5 || 3:00

|-  bgcolor="#cfc"
| 2006-05-03 || Win ||align=left| Khunsuk Phetsupapan || Daorungchujarean, Rajadamnern Stadium || Bangkok, Thailand || Decision || 5 || 3:00

|-  bgcolor="#cfc"
| 2006-03-20 || Win ||align=left| Khunsuk Phetsupapan || Daorungchujarean, Rajadamnern Stadium || Bangkok, Thailand || Decision || 5 || 3:00

|-  bgcolor="#cfc"
| 2006-02-09 || Win ||align=left| Phetnamek Sor.Srisawat || Daorungchujarean, Rajadamnern Stadium || Bangkok, Thailand || Decision || 5 || 3:00

|-  style="background:#cfc;"
| 2005-12-29 || Win||align=left| Noppakao Tor.Pansit || Jarumueang, Rajadamnern Stadium || Bangkok, Thailand || Decision || 5|| 3:00

|-  style="background:#cfc;"
| 2005-11-23 || Win||align=left| Noppakao Tor.Pansit || Daorungchujaroen, Rajadamnern Stadium || Bangkok, Thailand || Decision || 5|| 3:00 
|-
! style=background:white colspan=9 |

|-  style="background:#cfc;"
| 2005-10-10 || Win ||align=left| Denlangu Tor.Samakhom || Rajadamnern Stadium || Bangkok, Thailand || Decision || 5 || 3:00

|- bgcolor="#cfc"
| 2005-08-22 || Win ||align=left| Hiroki Ishii || SNKA "Titans 2nd" || Tokyo, Japan || Decision (Unanimous) || 5 || 3:00 
|-
! style="background:white" colspan=9 |

|-  style="background:#cfc;"
| 2005-06-13 || Win ||align=left| Noppakao Sor Wanchat || Daorungchujaroen, Rajadamnern Stadium || Bangkok, Thailand || Decision || 5 || 3:00

|-  style="background:#fbb;"
| 2005-05-12 || Loss ||align=left| Lakhin Sor Saraithong ||Daorungchujaroen, Rajadamnern Stadium || Bangkok, Thailand || KO || || 
|-
! style=background:white colspan=9 |

|-  style="background:#cfc;"
| 2005-03-03 || Win ||align=left| Sornkom Jocky Gym ||Daorungchujaroen, Rajadamnern Stadium || Bangkok, Thailand || Decision || 5||3:00 
|-
! style=background:white colspan=9 |

|-  style="background:#cfc;"
| 2005-01-06 || Win ||align=left| Sornkom Jocky Gym ||Daorungchujaroen, Rajadamnern Stadium || Bangkok, Thailand || Decision || 5||3:00

|-  style="background:#cfc;"
| 2004-12-13 || Win||align=left| Denthasai Kiatwipat || Daorungchujaroen, Rajadamnern Stadium || Bangkok, Thailand || Decision || 5||3:00

|-  style="background:#fbb;"
| 2004-10-27 || Loss ||align=left| Denthasai Kiatwipat || Daorungchujaroen, Rajadamnern Stadium || Bangkok, Thailand || Decision || 5||3:00

|-  style="background:#cfc;"
| 2004-09-30 || Win ||align=left| Tapluang Bor Chor Ror.2 || Daorungchujaroen, Rajadamnern Stadium || Bangkok, Thailand || Decision || 5||3:00

|-  style="background:#fbb;"
| 2004-09-01 || Loss ||align=left| Klangsuan SasiprapaGym || Jarumueang, Rajadamnern Stadium || Bangkok, Thailand || Decision || 5||3:00

|-  style="background:#cfc;"
| 2004-07-28 || Win ||align=left| Attaphon Por.Samranchai ||Daorungchujaroen + Jarumueang, Rajadamnern Stadium || Bangkok, Thailand || Decision || 5||3:00

|-  style="background:#fbb;"
| 2004-05-31 || Loss ||align=left| Sornkom Jocky Gym ||Daorungchujaroen + Jarumueang, Rajadamnern Stadium || Bangkok, Thailand || Decision || 5||3:00

|-  style="background:#fbb;"
| 2004-02-23 || Loss ||align=left| Jomtap Mahasarakham ||Daorungchujaroen + Jarumueang, Rajadamnern Stadium || Bangkok, Thailand || Decision || 5||3:00

|-  style="background:#fbb;"
| 2004-01-01 || Loss ||align=left| Khumsap Kiatnakhonchon ||Daorungchujaroen + Jarumueang, Rajadamnern Stadium || Bangkok, Thailand || Decision || 5||3:00

|-  style="background:#fbb;"
| 2003-12-11 || Loss ||align=left| Thirachai Muangsurin ||Daorungchujaroen, Rajadamnern Stadium || Bangkok, Thailand || Decision || 5||3:00

|-  style="background:#fbb;"
| 2003-11-03 || Loss ||align=left| Srisawat Sakmuang Klaeng ||Daorungchujaroen + Jarumueang, Rajadamnern Stadium || Bangkok, Thailand || Decision || 5||3:00

|-  style="background:#cfc;"
| 2003-09-29 || Win ||align=left| Jomtap Mahasarakham ||Daorungchujaroen + Jarumueang, Rajadamnern Stadium || Bangkok, Thailand || Decision || 5||3:00

|-  style="background:#cfc;"
| 2003-08-27 || Win ||align=left| Chekbil Tharmachat||Daorungchujaroen + Jarumueang, Rajadamnern Stadium || Bangkok, Thailand || Decision || 5||3:00

|-
| colspan=9 | Legend:

See also
List of male kickboxers

References

1981 births
Living people
Jaroenchai Kesagym
Jaroenchai Kesagym
Jaroenchai Kesagym